The Eintracht Frankfurt Rugby is a German rugby union club from Frankfurt am Main, currently playing in the 2nd Rugby-Bundesliga, the second tier of rugby in Germany. It is part of a larger club, the Eintracht Frankfurt, which also offers other sports like association football, table tennis and basketball.

The team has twice appeared in the German rugby union championship final, in 1940 and 1965, but lost on both occasions. It was also a founding member of the Rugby-Bundesliga in 1971.

History
Formed in 1923, the team, for the most part of its history, stood and stands in the shadow of local rival SC 1880 Frankfurt. In 1931, Julius Fischer became the first Eintracht player to appear for the German national rugby team.

The clubs rugby department achieved its first national success in 1940, when it reached the German championship final, losing 6-19 to FV 1897 Linden. It made a second finals appearance in 1965, this time losing 12-17 to TSV Victoria Linden.

In 1971, Eintracht became a founding member of the southern division of the Rugby-Bundesliga.

The club did not survive in the Rugby-Bundesliga however, eventually being relegated to the tier-three Rugby-Regionalliga Hesse, where it plays today. In the early 2000s, the team took part in the promotion round to the 2nd Rugby-Bundesliga South/West but did not succeed in achieving promotion to this level, instead remaining a top of the table side in the Regionalliga. It has won the local Hesse championship more than ten times since 1955.

From 2010 onwards, Eintracht entered the new third division 3rd Liga South/West, where it played as a mid-table side. However, a league expansion saw the club return to the 2nd Bundesliga for 2012-13. In the 2012-13 season the club competed in the 2nd Bundesliga, finishing in the lower half of the table and qualifying for the play-offs for the Liga-Pokal. The club was knocked out in the first round of the play-offs after a defeat at Welfen SC Braunschweig.

The club qualified for the south-west division DRV-Pokal in 2013–14, but missed out on the play-offs after coming last in its group. In the 2014–15 season the club finished fifth in the south-west Liga-Pokal group but was knocked out in the quarter finals of the play-offs after a 48–40 loss to RC Dresden.

Club honours
 German rugby union championship
 Runners up: 1940, 1965
 Rugby-Regionalliga Hesse
 Champions: 2002, 2003, 2010
 Runners up: 2004, 2009

Recent seasons
Recent seasons of the club:

 Until 2001, when the single-division Bundesliga was established, the season was divided in autumn and spring, a Vorrunde and Endrunde, whereby the top teams of the Rugby-Bundesliga would play out the championship while the bottom teams together with the autumn 2nd Bundesliga champion would play for Bundesliga qualification. The remainder of the 2nd Bundesliga teams would play a spring round to determine the relegated clubs. Where two placing's are shown, the first is autumn, the second spring. In 2012 the Bundesliga was expanded from ten to 24 teams and the 2nd Bundesliga from 20 to 24  with the leagues divided into four regional divisions.

References

External links
  Official website
  Official website of the rugby department
  Eintracht Frankfurt club info at totalrugby.de

German rugby union clubs
Rugby clubs established in 1923
Rugby union in Frankfurt
Rugby
1923 establishments in Germany